Richard Winters Peebles (born 1956), who performs under the name Rikki, is a Scottish singer, songwriter and producer who is known for having written songs for the band Middle of the Road.

Peebles's song "Only the Light" won the BBC's A Song for Europe contest in 1987 going on to be the UK entry in the Eurovision Song Contest 1987 where it placed 13th out of 22 .  It failed to reach the UK Top 75 singles chart.

Discography

Albums

Singles

References

External links
 

Musicians from Glasgow
Scottish songwriters
Scottish pop singers
British hi-NRG musicians
CBS Records artists
Eurovision Song Contest entrants for the United Kingdom
Eurovision Song Contest entrants of 1987
Living people
1956 births
Date of birth missing (living people)